Ashwini Jagtap is an Indian politician and widow of Laxman Pandurang Jagtap who will serve as Member of 14th Maharashtra Legislative Assembly from Chinchwad Assembly constituency. She is first woman MLA from Chinchwad Assembly constituency.

Personal life 
She hails from Satara district. She is daughter of a retired police officer. She is widow of Laxman Pandurang Jagtap. She got education upto 10th standard from Huzurpaga.

References 

Indian politician stubs
Indian politicians

Year of birth missing (living people)
Living people